Nanakshahi bricks  were decorative bricks used for structural walls during the Mughal era.

Uses

This variety of brick tiles were of moderate dimensions and could be used for reinforcing lime concretes in the structural walls and other thick components. But, as they made moldings, cornices, plasters, etc. easy to work into a variety of shapes, they were more often used as cladding or decorative material.

General specifications

More often than not, the structures on which they were used, especially the Sikh temples (Gurudwaras), were a combination of two systems: trabeated and post-and-lintel, or based on arches. The surfaces were treated with lime or gypsum plaster which was molded into cornices, pilasters, and other structural as well as non-structural embellishments. Brick and lime mortar as well as lime or gypsum plaster, and lime concrete were the most favoured building materials, although stone (such as red stone and white marble) were also used in a number of shrines. Many fortresses were built using these bricks.

See also
 Lakhori bricks
 Sikh architecture

References

External links
Nanak Shahi Bricks
Ancient Home of Baba Sohan Singh Bhakna,(of Ghadar Party fame) in trouble
Viraasat Haveli frozen in Time

Indian architectural history
Sikh architecture
Mughal architecture elements
Building materials